Chinese Professional Baseball League recognizes earned run average champions each season. The champion would be awarded.

Champions

External links

Chinese Professional Baseball League lists
Chinese Professional Baseball League awards